Bismillah ceremony, also known as Bismillahkhani, is a cultural ceremony celebrated mostly by Muslims from the subcontinent in countries such as Bangladesh, India and Pakistan. It marks the start for a child in learning to recite the Qur'an in its Arabic script. It is not a religiously prescribed milestone. The ceremony marks how a child should read the Qur’an and say prayers properly. The ceremony is named after the bismillah ("In the name of God"), the beginning words in the Qur'an.

The ceremony
It is held for both boys and girls between the age 4 and 5, sometimes when the child turns four years, four months and four days. The child is dressed in a traditional dress and jewelry and is made to recite the opening phrase of the Qur'ran, Bism illāh ir-raḥmān ir-raḥīm (In the name of Allah, the Compassionate, the Merciful) (786).

It is traditionally a grand evening affair with family and friends. Lavish food is served for dinner and guests exchange hugs and gifts.

See also
 Religious initiation rites

References

Islamic culture
Indian culture
Ceremonies
Rites of passage
Islam in India
Islam in Pakistan